"In the beginning of" (bereshith in Biblical Hebrew) is the opening-phrase or incipit used in the Bible in Genesis 1:1. In John 1:1 of the New Testament, the word Archē is translated into English with the same phrase.

Etymology
The translated word in the Hebrew Bible is Bereshith: "In beginning". The definite article (the) is missing, but implied.

Archē is the original word used in John 1:1.

Usage
The King James Version of Genesis 1:1 is translated as "In the beginning God created the heaven and the Earth." The King James Version of John 1:1 is translated as "In the beginning was the Word, and the Word was with God, and the Word was God."

Tradition and theology

In Judaism

The Book of Genesis as a whole has the title of Bereshith ( בְּרֵאשִׁית‎) by its incipit in Hebrew, as with other books of the Hebrew Bible. The first word, and thus God's role as Creator, is recited in the Aleinu prayer near the end of each of the three daily prayer-services.

In Christianity

Genesis 1:1 is commonly paralleled by Christian theologians with John 1:1 as something that John the Apostle alluded to. Theologian Charles Ellicott wrote:
"The reference to the opening words of the Old Testament is obvious, and is the more striking when we remember that a Jew would constantly speak of and quote from the book of Genesis as "Berēshîth" ("in the beginning"). It is quite in harmony with the Hebrew tone of this Gospel to do so, and it can hardly be that St. John wrote his Berēshîth without having that of Moses present to his mind, and without being guided by its meaning.

See also
 Bereshit (disambiguation)
 Once upon a time

References

Bibliography

Further reading

Bereshit (parashah)
Biblical phrases
Book of Genesis
English phrases
Genesis 1